Dr. Boris is an Ivorian sitcom created by Michael Konan Mikayo that has been broadcast since 2008. It is also broadcast in Togo, Senegal, Mali, Burkina Faso, and Benin.

External links
Official site 

Ivorian television sitcoms
2008 establishments in Ivory Coast
2008 Ivorian television series debuts